The Dalmatian Hinterland (or ) is the southern inland hinterland in the historical Croatian region of Dalmatia. The name zagora means "beyond (the) hills", which is a reference to the fact that it is the part of Dalmatia that is not coastal and the existence of the concordant coastline where hills run parallel to the coast.

Geography

Dalmatian Zagora, in the strict sense, spans from the hinterland east of Šibenik to the border with Bosnia and Herzegovina and continues south to Vrgorac, just north of the Neum corridor. Its borders are present in two counties: Split-Dalmatia and Šibenik-Knin.

The terrain in Zagora is fairly rugged: in the region immediately bordering the coastline, it is mostly flat but dry, mainly covered with makija (maquis, macchia). More inland, greener pastures can be seen, as the climate and elevations change. Karst topography dominates the landscape. The land is interspersed with river canyons, of Krka, Čikola, Cetina and others.

One national park is located in Zagora, the Krka National Park.

The aforementioned geographical and climate conditions influenced the life patterns of the historically important shepherd population: in the wintertime, they were moving their numerous flocks from the mountains to the coast. Historic population of Zagora has included the Illyrians and the Vlachs.

Settlements

The area has had diminishing human settlement in the last few centuries, although a lot of smaller and larger villages remain scattered all over Zagora. The larger towns include Knin, Drniš, Vrlika, Sinj, Vrgorac, Trilj and Imotski. Villages include Biskupija, Kistanje, Kijevo, Unešić, Oklaj, Ružić, Aržano, Dicmo, Muć, Cista Provo, Prgomet, Hrvace, Lovreć, Šestanovac, Zmijavci, etc.

Infrastructure

Two major roads intersect Zagora – the D1 state road which comes from Zagreb, crosses from Lika through Knin and Sinj, down to Split, and the recently built A1 highway, which meanders near Zadar and Benkovac, passing throughout Zagora, via the Dugopolje exit (to Split) and on to Ploče.

The railway links Zagreb with Knin, from Knin to Zadar, from Knin to Perković, where the line splits to Šibenik or to Split.

See also
 Geography of Croatia
 Morlachs

Sources
 Dalmatinska zagora

External links
 Dalmatinska Zagora (archived)
 Dalmatinska zagora – nepoznata zemlja (archived)

Historical regions in Croatia
Geography of Split-Dalmatia County
Geography of Šibenik-Knin County
Dalmatia